The 1976 Columbia Lions football team was an American football team that represented Columbia University during the 1976 NCAA Division I football season. Columbia tied for last place in the Ivy League. 

In their third season under head coach  William Campbell, the Lions compiled a 3–6 record and were outscored 247 to 137. Ed Backus and Dave McAvoy were the team captains.  

The Lions' 2–5 conference record placed them in a four-way tie for fifth place, at the bottom of the Ivy League standings. Columbia was outscored 169 to 99 by Ivy opponents. 

Columbia played its home games at Baker Field in Upper Manhattan, in New York City.

Schedule

References

Columbia
Columbia Lions football seasons
Columbia Lions football